Baghuiyeh or Baghueeyeh may refer to:
Baghuiyeh, Baft
Baghuiyeh, Gevar, Jiroft County
Baghuiyeh, Sarduiyeh, Jiroft County
Baghuiyeh, Rabor